Srđan Jovanović (born 9 April 1986) is a Serbian football referee who officiates in the Serbian SuperLiga. He has been a FIFA referee since 2015, and is ranked as a UEFA elite category referee.

Refereeing career
In 2014, Jovanović began officiating in the Serbian SuperLiga. His first match as referee was on 30 August 2014 between Radnički Niš and Donji Srem, in which he showed a red card to Miloš Petrović. In 2015, he was put on the FIFA referees list. He officiated his first senior international match on 16 January 2016 between the United Arab Emirates and Iceland. Jovanović also officiated match in the Super League Greece on 17 March 2019 between Atromitos and AEK Athens. In 2019, he was selected as a referee for the 2019 FIFA U-17 World Cup in Brazil.

Personal life
Jovanović was born in the Kaluđerica neighbourhood of Belgrade in SR Serbia, SFR Yugoslavia.

See also
List of football referees

References

External links
 Profile at EU-Football.info

1986 births
Living people
Sportspeople from Belgrade
Serbian football referees